Yupa Sanitklang (born August 14, 1991) is a Thai indoor volleyball player. She is a current member of the Thailand women's national volleyball team.

Career
She participated at the 2016 World Grand Prix and 2016 Nations League.

Clubs
  Ayutthaya A.T.C.C (2006–2015)
  Nakhon Ratchasima (2015–present)

Awards

Individuals 
 2010 Thailand League – "Best Receiver"
 2012–13 Thailand League – "Best Digger"
 2013–14 Thailand League – "Best Receiver"
 2015–16 Thailand League – "Best Libero"

Clubs
 2008–09 Thailand League –  Runner-up, with Krungkao Mektec
 2009–10 Thailand League –  Champion, with Krungkao Mektec
 2010–11 Thailand League –  Runner-up, with Krungkao Mektec
 2014 Thai–Denmark Super League –  Champion, with Ayutthaya A.T.C.C
 2014–15 Thailand League –  Runner-up, with Ayutthaya A.T.C.C
 2017–18 Thailand League –  Runner-up, with Nakhon Ratchasima
 2018–19 Thailand League –  Champion, with Nakhon Ratchasima

References

External links
 FIVB Biography

1991 births
Living people
Nuttaporn Sanitklang
Nuttaporn Sanitklang
Competitors at the 2019 Southeast Asian Games
Nuttaporn Sanitklang
Southeast Asian Games medalists in volleyball
Liberos
Nuttaporn Sanitklang